Langquaid is a municipality in the district of Kelheim in Bavaria in Germany.

Ortsteile
Villages affiliated to the administration (Ortsteil) of Langquaid are
Adlhausen
Hellring
Leitenhausen
Niederleierndorf
Oberleierndorf
Paring
Unterschneidhart
Mitterschneidhart
Oberschneidhart

References

Markt Langquaid - Ortsteile

External links
Official homepage of Markt Langquaid

Kelheim (district)